The Arrowverse is a media franchise and shared fictional universe that is the setting of superhero television series airing on The CW, produced by DC Entertainment and based on characters that appear in DC Comics publications. The shared universe includes seven live-action television series, Arrow, Batwoman, Black Lightning, The Flash, Supergirl, DC's Legends of Tomorrow, and two animated web series, Vixen, and Freedom Fighters: The Ray.

Each series has its own lead actors: Stephen Amell stars as Oliver Queen / Green Arrow on Arrow; Grant Gustin stars as Barry Allen / Flash on The Flash; Megalyn Echikunwoke stars as Mari McCabe / Vixen in Vixen; Melissa Benoist stars as Kara Danvers / Supergirl on Supergirl; Legends of Tomorrow features an ensemble cast including original headliner Arthur Darvill as Rip Hunter, subsequent headliner Caity Lotz as Sara Lance / White Canary, alongside Victor Garber as Martin Stein / Firestorm, Brandon Routh as Ray Palmer / The Atom, Ciara Renée as Kendra Saunders / Hawkgirl, Franz Drameh as Jefferson Jackson / Firestorm, Dominic Purcell as Mick Rory / Heat Wave, Wentworth Miller as Leonard Snart / Captain Cold, Falk Hentschel as Carter Hall / Hawkman, Amy Pemberton as the voice of Gideon, Nick Zano as Nate Heywood / Steel, Maisie Richardson-Sellers as Amaya Jiwe / Vixen, Matt Letscher as Eobard Thawne / Reverse-Flash, and Tala Ashe as Zari Tomaz; Cress Williams stars as Jefferson Pierce / Black Lightning on Black Lightning; Russell Tovey stars as Ray Terrill / The Ray in Freedom Fighters: The Ray; Batwoman stars original headliner Ruby Rose as Kate Kane / Batwoman in season 1 and subsequent headliner Javicia Leslie as Ryan Wilder / Batwoman in season 2.

List indicators 
These tables include main cast members, as well as notable guest stars that appear across two (or more) different series.
A dark grey cell indicates the character was not in the season, or that the character's presence in the season has not yet been announced.
An  indicates the actor was part of the main cast for the season.
A  indicates the actor was in the season as an "Arrowverse regular".
A  indicates a voice-only role.
A number beside a character's name indicates the character is from that alternate world (i.e. a  indicates a character from Earth-2).
A letter in the Further series column indicates the character has gone on to appear in another series, and links to the appropriate section for more information (A links to Arrow, B links to Batwoman, F links to The Flash, V links to Vixen, S links to the Supergirl, L links to Legends of Tomorrow, and FF links to Freedom Fighters).

Arrow

The Flash

Vixen

Supergirl

Legends of Tomorrow

Freedom Fighters : The Ray

Black Lightning

Batwoman

Notes

References

Lists of DC Comics television characters
Lists of actors by American television series
Lists of actors by crime television series
Lists of actors by drama television series
Lists of actors by science fiction television series
Cast members
Lists of actors by superhero television series